Vaneh Rangineh (also Romanized as Vaneh Rangīneh; also known as Vandeh Rangīneh) is a village in Sanjabi Rural District, Kuzaran District, Kermanshah County, Kermanshah Province, Iran. At the 2006 census, its population was 162, in 27 families.

References 

Populated places in Kermanshah County